Cryptomma multistriatum is a species of beetle in the family Carabidae, the only species in the genus Cryptomma.

References

Scaritinae